The RENK Group (stylised as RENK Group) is a German company and ranked among the top ten companies in the German defense industry in terms of sales in 2010. Its main production sites are located in Augsburg, Rheine, Hanover and Winterthur (Switzerland) and - following the acquisition of the British company Horstman Holdings Ltd. in 2019 - in Bath (England) and Sterling Heights (USA).

The company originated from a listed subsidiary of Volkswagen Vermögensverwaltungs-GmbH, which held 76% of the company's shares. At the end of January 2020, Triton bought VW's stake in Renk. Since then, the RENK AG belongs to the Rebecca BidCo AG, a portfolio company of the Triton Fund V, which is managed by the Triton Group. In 2021, the RENK AG was merged with the Rebecca BidCo AG and subsequently transformed into RENK GmbH.

History
The company was named after its founder Johann Julius Renk (* January 4, 1848; † November 3, 1896). Following Johann Renk's death, the company was converted into a stock corporation in 1897. In 1923, the company became a member of the GHH Group, which gave rise to today's MAN Group. In 1987, the company was renamed Renk Aktiengesellschaft. Due to the Volkswagen AG's takeover of a majority interest in the MAN Group, the Renk AG also became a member of the Volkswagen Group between 2011 and 2020. In the wake of the takeover by Triton, the company was delisted from the stock exchange in spring of 2020 and converted into a GmbH (limited liability company).

19th century
Johann Renk completed his locksmith and machinist apprenticeship at the Maschinenfabrik Augsburg (Machine Factory Augsburg) and worked as a machinist at the Maschinenfabrik L.A. Riedinger (L.A. Riedinger Machine Factory) from 1866. During these years, Renk envisioned a machine that could completely produce gears mechanically. The standard procedure at that time involved machine preparation of the gears and then arduous finishing work by filing the teeth using templates. On May 1, 1873, Johann Renk founded a small mechanical workshop in Augsburg's Lech Quarter  (Am Brunnenlech 19) for the mechanical production of gears. First, he created a semi-automatic spur gear planing machine that worked with templates. This was followed in 1877 by a machine that could be used to manufacture conical cogs for beval gears. Renk was granted patent DRP 8000/79 in 1879 for his invention, which generated considerable excitement among experts at the time. In the same year, the company moved to the site of an abandoned brickworks on Gögginger Strasse. The company's headquarters are still located there today. Two years later, the entrepreneur established a company health insurance fund for his workforce.

In the following years, the company operated in two shifts in order to be able to deliver orders on time. In 1888, Renk employed 37 people and owned, among other machine tools, 15 self-built gear planing machines. 
When Johann Renk died in November 1896 at the age of only 48, he left behind a company with over 100 employees who produced approximately 12,000 gears of all kinds each year. Turnover amounted to approx. 500,000 German marks at the time.

After the death of its founder, the company was converted to a joint stock corporation on March 11, 1897, under the new name "Zahnräderfabrik Augsburg vorm. Joh. Renk Akt. Ges.". The newly founded corporation acquired the company, together with its property, equipment and machinery, from Johann Renk's heirs at a price of 666,391.51 German marks.
 
In the corporation's first fiscal year, the workforce consisted of 130 employees. Normal working hours were 60 hours per week: weekdays from 6 a.m. to 6 p.m. with a lunch break of 1 hour and 20 minutes; a snack break in the morning and 15 minutes in the afternoon. With overtime, work was carried out from 5 a.m. to 8:30 p.m., with an average hourly wage of 40 pfennigs.

20th century
In the years following the turn of the century, the company expanded production and solidified its good reputation. In the fiscal year of 1913/14, the company had a workforce of 842 employees, and the work week amounted to 58 hours.

In order to mitigate the consequences of the First World War and ensure the company's continued existence, it was incorporated into the Gutehoffnungshütte Engineering Group based in Oberhausen in 1923. Thus, over the following years, Renk received economic support both in the form of important customers within the Group and inexpensive supply sources for fuels, pig iron and steel. After 1930, Renk began to concentrate on manufacturing large gear units for rolling mills and ships.

In the years before and during the Second World War, the company was a major supplier to the German Wehrmacht (German armed forces). This included the large-scale employment of forced laborers during the Second World War. In August 1942, 180 men and 30 women from the territories of the Soviet Union alone were in forced labor at Renk. In 1944, about 2,000 forced laborers for the Messerschmitt, Renk and Alpine companies were housed in Sammellager V in Augsburg.

Among the most important customers after the Second World War were steel processing companies, such as the Group's sister company Schloemann. By the end of the 1950s, sales had increased to around 50 million German marks. At that time, Renk employed around 1,400 workers. In the following decades, the company expanded its product range by acquiring competitor companies. For example, the "Slide Bearings and Couplings" product division of the Wülfel ironworks in Hanover was acquired by Renk in 1975. In 1986, the company acquired shares in the Tacke GmbH in Rheine, incorporating the "Industrial and Marine Gear Units" product divisions into their product portfolio. In the same year, the "Control and Test Systems" product division was founded.

In 1987, the company was renamed the "Renk Aktiengesellschaft" and was divided into the following product divisions: "Automatic Vehicle Transmissions", "Drive Elements" and "Test Systems". The French companies Société Européenne d'Engrenages and Société d'Equipements, Systèmes et Mécanismes joined Renk in 1989. In 1995, the Renk Tacke GmbH was finally merged with the Renk AG.

21st century
In 2000, Renk took over the test rig activities of the US company Labeco for their "Test Systems" division. At the same time, the product division "Slide Bearings" belonging to A. Friedr. Flender AG was added to the company. The "Test Systems" division was renamed to Renk Test System GmbH in 2004.

In 2007, the company made headlines due to a bribery scandal: An appeals court in Paris issued suspended sentences against Renk CEO Hirt and his former deputy Schulze (for details see the Section "Criticism").

In the same year, the Renk-Maag Gmbh was founded. It integrated the business activities turbo gearboxes and spare parts (also for maritime applications), as well as synchronous clutch, shift and gear couplings from the Maag Gear AG.

In 2011, the Renk AG became a member of the Volkswagen Group as a result of the Volkswagen AG's acquisition of a majority interest in the MAN SE.

In 2012, Renk Shanghai Service and Commercial Ltd. Co. was founded, marking the opening of a Renk service center in Shanghai.

In 2017, the Renk AG acquired the Dutch company Damen Schelde Gears B.V., a manufacturer of marine gear units.  Also in this year, the subsidiaries Renk Gears Private Ltd. in India and Renk Korea Co. Ltd. in Korea were founded.

At the end of 2018, the Renk AG was transferred from the MAN SE to the Volkswagen Vermögensverwaltungs-GmbH. In 2019, the Renk AG acquired the suspension specialist Horstman Holdings Limited. This group of companies provides suspensions for wheeled and tracked armored fighting vehicles.

The majority owner Volkswagen signed a sale agreement for its share with the Triton company at the end of January 2020. In spring 2021, Triton merged the Renk AG with the acquisition vehicle Rebecca BidCo AG and subsequently converted the company into the Renk GmbH.

Corporate structure

Business units
The Renk Group is divided into four independent strategic business units: special gear units (industrial and marine propulsion), vehicle drives, standard gear units and slide bearings. In addition, test systems for road and rail vehicles, military tracked vehicles, aviation and wind turbines have been manufactured since 1960.

Management
On January 31, 2021, the previous member of the board Christian Hammel resigned and Wilfried Vogl was appointed by the supervisory board as his successor. On May 1, 2021, Susanne Wiegand succeeded Florian Hofbauer, the previous chairman of the executive board, and took over as chief executive officer.

Board of directors
Since May 2021, the board of directors at the Renk GmbH has consisted of the following persons: Claus von Hermann (chairman of the supervisory board), Angela Steinecker (deputy chairwoman of the supervisory board, employee representative), Swantje Conrad, Sascha Dudzik (employee representative), Cécile Duthell, Lothar Evers (employee representative), Hauke Kai Uwe Hansen, Adela Lieb (employee representative), Klaus Refle (employee representative), Mario Sommer (employee representative), Klaus Stahlmann and Cletus von Pichler.

Employee representation/works council

The Renk Group has works councils at its Augsburg, Rheine and Hanover sites. The Augsburg works council is also responsible for the Renk Test System GmbH and at the same time acts as the central works council for all German locations of the Renk GmbH. It consists of a total of 12 members, three of whom are exempt from their duties as works council members.

Locations and branches
The Renk Group has manufacturing plants in Augsburg (vehicle, industrial and marine transmissions, test systems), Rheine(industrial and marine transmissions, couplings), Hanover (slide bearings, couplings), Winterthur, Switzerland, Bath,  England and Sterling Heights, Michigan, US, as well as further subsidiaries in France, United States, Brazil, Turkey, United Arab Emirates, Shanghai, South Korea, India, the Netherlands and Canada. The Renk GmbH is represented in over 100 countries worldwide.

Subsidiaries
 Renk France S.A.S., Saint-Ouen-l'Aumône, France
 Renk Corporation, Duncan, USA
 Renk Test System GmbH, Augsburg, Germany
 Renk Systems Corporation, Camby, USA
 Renk Shanghai Services Commercial Co. Ltd, Shanghai, People's Republic of China
 Renk Transmisyon Sanayi A.S., Istanbul, Turkey
 Renk UAE LLC, Abu Dhabi, United Arab Emirates
 Cofical Renk Mancais do Brasil Ltda., Guaramirim, Brazil
 Renk Gears India, Bengaluru, India
 Renk Korea, Busan, South Korea
 Damen Schelde Gears B.V., Vlissingen, Netherlands
 Horstman Holdings Ltd., Bath, England
 Horstman Inc., Sterling Heights, USA
 Horstman Systems Inc., Woodbridge, Canada
 RENK-MAAG GmbH, Winterthur, Switzerland

Criticism

Controversial arms exports
A significant part of the Renk GmbH's sales is generated by the production of gearboxes for tanks and warships. In the past, there has been repeated criticism that the armaments produced by German companies are also exported to crisis and conflict regions, contrary to legal regulations. In particular, exports to countries such as Saudi Arabia and Algeria have been criticized.

Bribery scandal
On September 29, 1993, the Renk AG signed a contract with GIAT for the supply of transmissions for 436 Leclerc tanks. Turnover from this transaction amounted to approximately 100 million euros. The tanks were manufactured for the United Arab Emirates. To secure this contract, Renk board spokesman Manfred Hirt and his deputy Norbert Schulze paid bribes amounting to a total of DM 5.13 million to Jean-Charles Marchiani and his "friend and neighbor" Yves Manuel. Marchiani was an advisor to the French Minister of the Interior, Charles Pasqua, during this period and later prefect of the Var department. The cover for the payment was a consulting contract dated September 19, 1993, with the company Irish Euro Agencies Ltd. The money was first deposited in an account at Westminster Bank in London and then channeled into two Swiss accounts at banks in Geneva.

Marchiani was sentenced to three years' imprisonment without probation and a fine of €150,000 for bribery. Yves Manuel received a three-year suspended sentence and a fine of €150,000 for complicity in bribery of a public official. The sentences imposed on Hirt and Schulze under French law were also upheld by the Paris Court of Appeals in March 2007. Both received 18-month suspended sentences and fines of €100,000 each. Manfred Hirt resigned from his position as Spokesman of the Board of the Renk AG and handed it over to Florian Hofbauer effective August 31, 2007, and left the board completely at the end of 2007.

Business figures
Information from the management report of the Renk Group for the fiscal year 2018:

 Incoming orders: €529 million (previous year: €434 million)
 Turnover: €502 million (previous year: €469 million)
 Workforce: 2,319 employees (previous year: 2,235 employees)
 Earnings before interest and taxes: €60 million (previous year: €60 million)
 Rate of return: 12.0% (previous year: 12.8%)
 Earnings per share: €6.25 (previous year: €6.30)
 Net cash flow: €1 million (previous year: €1 million)
 Dividend proposal: distribution per share of €2.20 (previous year: €2.20)

References

Literature
 
 Victor-Georg Hohmann: Augsburger Wirtschaftsalmanach. Archiv-Verlag, 1952.

External links

 Frühe Dokumente und Zeitungsartikel zur Renk GmbH in der Pressemappe 20. Jahrhundert der ZBW – Leibniz-Informationszentrum Wirtschaft
 Renk Unternehmenswebsite
 Eintrag im Lobbyregister des Deutschen Bundestages

Companies based in Augsburg
Manufacturing companies of Germany